Oxyelophila is a genus of moths of the family Crambidae. The genus was described by William Trowbridge Merrifield Forbes in 1922.

Species
Oxyelophila callista (Forbes, 1922)
Oxyelophila harpalis (Snellen, 1901)
Oxyelophila lanceolalis (Hampson, 1897)
Oxyelophila melanograpta (Hampson, 1917)
Oxyelophila micropalis (Hampson, 1906)
Oxyelophila necomalis (Dyar, 1914)
Oxyelophila puralis (Schaus, 1912)
Oxyelophila ticonalis (Dyar, 1914)

References

Acentropinae
Crambidae genera
Taxa named by William Trowbridge Merrifield Forbes